Daniel William Peiffer (born March 29, 1951) is a former American football center in the National Football League for the Chicago Bears and the Washington Redskins. Peiffer played for the Florida Blazers of the World Football League in 1974.  He played college football at Ellsworth Community College and Southeast Missouri State University and was drafted in the fourteenth round of the 1973 NFL Draft by the St. Louis Cardinals.

His son Blake Peiffer is an All-Conference linebacker at Southeast Missouri State.

References

1951 births
Living people
People from Sigourney, Iowa
American football centers
Southeast Missouri State Redhawks football players
Chicago Bears players
Washington Redskins players
People from Keota, Iowa